Artesian City is an unincorporated community in Twin Falls County, Idaho, United States, roughly  west-northwest of Filer. Artesian City had a post office from 1907–1909.

Peavey is part of the Twin Falls, Idaho Metropolitan Statistical Area.

See also

References

Unincorporated communities in Idaho
Unincorporated communities in Twin Falls County, Idaho